Crimes is the fourth studio album by the American band The Blood Brothers, released on October 12, 2004 on V2 Records. It was their first major label album. Produced by John Goodmanson, the album was recorded in two months in the band's hometown of Seattle.

Lyrical content
Much of the lyrics for the album are a political reaction to the mass media and the military policy of the Bush administration, inspired heavily by the election year of 2004.  “I thought the collective dissent of our generation would bring about positive change.  When that didn’t happen I felt like the bottom had fallen out,” vocalist Jordan Blilie commented.

 "Feed Me to the Forest" is "a picture of the hyper-industrialized times we live in."
 "Trash Flavored Trash" is "about the emptiness of news media."
 "Teen Heat" is about the distribution company Artistdirect with whom the band was having difficulties at the time.
 "Celebrator" and "Devastator" are direct criticisms of the United States military campaigns in Iraq and Afghanistan.

Track listing
All songs written by The Blood Brothers.
 "Feed Me to the Forest"  – 2:23
 "Trash Flavored Trash"  – 2:38
 "Love Rhymes with Hideous Car Wreck"  – 3:14
 "Peacock Skeleton with Crooked Feathers"  – 4:31
 "Teen Heat"  – 2:07
 "Rats and Rats and Rats for Candy"  – 3:52
 "Crimes"  – 4:00
 "My First Kiss at the Public Execution"  – 2:50
 "Live at the Apocalypse Cabaret"  – 3:12
 "Beautiful Horses"  – 1:47
 "Wolf Party"  – 3:28
 "Celebrator"  – 2:16
 "Devastator"  – 2:45

2009 reissue bonus tracks

 "Ladies and Gentlemen" - 2:46
 "Metronomes" - 4:55
 "Crimes (alt. version)" - 3:55
 "Peacock Skeleton With Crooked Feathers (alt. version)" - 3:30
 "Love Rhymes With Hideous Car Wreck (live)" - 3:21
 "Trash Flavored Trash - Live" (Reading Festival 2005) - 2:44
 "Peacock Skeleton With Crooked Feathers - Live" (Reading Festival 2005) - 4:39
 "My First Kiss at the Public Execution - Live" (Reading Festival 2005) - 2:35
 "Live at the Apocalypse Cabaret - Live" (Reading Festival 2005) - 3:45
 "Rats and Rats and Rats for Candy - Live" (Reading Festival 2005) - 4:04
 "Teen Heat - Live" (Reading Festival 2005) - 2:02

Album leak
The album originally leaked as a 19-track unmastered CD.  The following tracks were on the leaked version, but did not make the final version of the album:
 "Ladies and Gentlemen" (also known as "Champagne Party")
 "Metronomes"
 "Wolf Faced Gladiators" (also known as "Gladiators")
 "Crimes (Alternate Version)"
 "Rats And Rats And Rats For Candy (Acoustic Riff)"
 "Noise"

Of the cut tracks, "Ladies and Gentlemen," "Metronomes," and the alternate version of "Crimes" were released on the band's Love Rhymes With Hideous Car Wreck EP released in 2006.

Personnel
The Blood Brothers
 Jordan Blilie - vocals, guitar, percussion
 Mark Gajadhar - drums and percussion
 Morgan Henderson - bass, guitar, upright bass, synthesizer, accordion, piano, laptop, backup vocals
 Cody Votolato - guitar, trumpet, backup vocals, percussion, whistle, E-Bow, baritone guitar
 Johnny Whitney - vocals, piano, Wurlitzer electric piano, Farfisa organ, percussion

Additional performers
 Nick Zinner - guitars on "Wolf Party"

Production and design
 John Goodmanson - producer, recording, mixer, engineer
 The Blood Brothers - co-producer
 Kip Beelman - engineer
 Justin Armstrong - assistant
 Jakael Trinstram - assistant
 Aaron Malasko - drum technician
 Johnny Whitney - layout
 Jordan Blilie - drawings

Vinyl information 
1st pressing: 333 copies
 333 Light Blue/White Marble w/ Black Labels & Screen Printed Cover (Hand Numbered) (20 of these are screened specially – pink ink goes light to dark from left to right)
2nd pressing: 3,050 copies
 508 Dark Red
 503 White
 513 Light Blue
 510 Purple/White Marble
 510 Pink
 508 Orange

3rd pressing: 979 copies
 501 Light Green
 478 Grey

4th pressing:  1,014 copies
 338 Half Translucent Green / Half White
 338 Translucent Dark Blue
 338 Black / Light Blue / Light Pink Tri-Color

5th pressing:
 510 Grey/Pink/Black Marble

6th pressing
 Yellow

References 

2004 albums
The Blood Brothers (band) albums
V2 Records albums
Albums produced by John Goodmanson
Albums recorded at Robert Lang Studios